Jiří Sekáč (born 10 June 1992) is a Czech professional ice hockey player who is currently playing with Lausanne HC of the National League (NL).

Playing career
As a youth, Sekáč played in the 2005 Quebec International Pee-Wee Hockey Tournament with a team from Chomutov.

Sekáč later played with HC Lev Praha in the Kontinental Hockey League and HC Sparta Praha in the Czech Extraliga. On 1 July 2014 Sekáč signed a two-year entry-level contract with the Canadiens worth $1,850,000. In his first North American season in 2014–15 he scored his first NHL goal on 16 October 2014 against Tuukka Rask of the Boston Bruins.

On 13 January 2015 Sekáč was invited to the 2015 Honda NHL All-Star Skills Competition as a replacement for Los Angeles Kings' forward Tanner Pearson. Known for his skating speed, he was drafted by Team Foligno, along with Canadiens' teammate Carey Price, and participated in the Bridgestone NHL Fastest Skater race, beating Aaron Ekblad with a time of 13.683s, making him the 6th fastest of the event.

After 50 games with the Canadiens on 24 February 2015 he was traded to the Anaheim Ducks in exchange for Devante Smith-Pelly.

In the following 2015–16 season, Sekáč was unable to secure a regular forward role and appeared in 22 games for 3 points with the Ducks before he was traded to the Chicago Blackhawks in exchange for Ryan Garbutt on 21 January 2016. Sekáč was used sparingly in 6 games with the Blackhawks registering one assist before being placed on waivers and claimed by the Arizona Coyotes on 27 February 2016. Sekac closed out the season with the Coyotes, appearing 11 games for two assists.

On 6 June 2016 Sekáč headed back to Europe and put pen to paper on a one-year deal with Ak Bars Kazan in a return to the Kontinental Hockey League.

On 1 May 2019, after three productive seasons with Ak Bars, Sekáč was traded to reigning champions, HC CSKA Moscow, in exchange for Igor Ozhiganov's KHL rights. He registered 25 points in 45 regular season games, before ending his season through injury.

As a free agent from CSKA, Sekáč continued his travelled career in the KHL, agreeing to a one-year contract with Avangard Omsk on 16 July 2020.

On July 28, 2021, Sekáč joined Lausanne HC of the National League (NL) on a three-year deal through the end of the 2023/24 season.

Career statistics

Regular season and playoffs

International

Awards and honours

References

External links

1992 births
Living people
Sportspeople from Kladno
Ak Bars Kazan players
Anaheim Ducks players
Arizona Coyotes players
Avangard Omsk players
Chicago Blackhawks players
HC CSKA Moscow players
Czech expatriate ice hockey players in Canada
Czech expatriate ice hockey players in Slovakia
Czech ice hockey left wingers
Lausanne HC players
HC Lev Poprad players
HC Lev Praha players
Ice hockey players at the 2018 Winter Olympics
Olympic ice hockey players of the Czech Republic
Montreal Canadiens players
Peterborough Petes (ice hockey) players
San Diego Gulls (AHL) players
HC Sparta Praha players
Undrafted National Hockey League players
Youngstown Phantoms players
Czech expatriate ice hockey players in the United States
Czech expatriate ice hockey players in Russia
Czech expatriate ice hockey players in Switzerland